Navan Racecourse is a horse racing venue at Proudstown near Navan, County Meath, Ireland, approximately 48 kilometres from Dublin. The course stages Flat racing but is best known for National Hunt racing. Navan Racecourse is owned by Horse Racing Ireland.

The course is one and a half miles round with a home straight of three-and-a-half furlongs, left-handed with wide sweeping bends and an uphill finish from two furlongs out. There is a straight sprint course of six furlongs.

Notable races

References

External links
Official website

 
Racecourse
Horse racing venues in the Republic of Ireland
Racecourse
Sports venues in County Meath